Drangedalsposten (The Drangedal Gazette) is a local Norwegian newspaper published in Drangedal in Telemark county. 

The newspaper is published every Thursday and it was founded by the local community in 1999 after the Orkla Group purchased and then incorporated the newspaper Drangedal Blad into Kragerø Blad Vestmar. The editor of the paper is Gry Rønjum.

Circulation
According to the Norwegian Audit Bureau of Circulations and National Association of Local Newspapers, Drangedalsposten has had the following annual circulation:
2004: 1,963
2005: 1,988
2006: 1,980
2007: 1,952
2008: 1,970
2009: 1,954
2010: 1,905
2011: 1,907
2012: 1,941
2013: 1,946
2014: 2,096
2015: 2,060
2016: 1,919

References

External links
Drangedalsposten home page

Weekly newspapers published in Norway
Norwegian-language newspapers
Mass media in Telemark
Drangedal
Publications established in 1999
1999 establishments in Norway